Kari Nordheim-Larsen (born 23 June 1948) is a Norwegian politician for the Labour Party. She was Minister of International Development from 1992 to 1997. She was also acting Minister of Children and Family Affairs from 1993 to 1994. From 2006 to 2018, Nordheim-Larsen was County Governor of Telemark.

References

1948 births
Living people
Ministers of International Development of Norway
Labour Party (Norway) politicians
Women government ministers of Norway
20th-century Norwegian women politicians
20th-century Norwegian politicians